The 2009 Omega Mission Hills World Cup took place from 26 November to 29 November at Mission Hills Golf Club in Shenzhen, China. It was the 55th World Cup. 28 countries competed as two-man teams. The team purse was $5,500,000 with $1,700,000 going to the winner. The event was won by Italy with a score of 259 (−29).

Qualification and format
The leading 18 available players from the Official World Golf Ranking on 1 September 2009 qualified. These 18 players then selected a player from their country to compete with them. The person they pick had to be ranked within the top 100 on the Official World Golf Ranking as of 1 September. If there was no other player from that country within the top 100 then the next highest ranked player would be their partner. If there was no other available player from that country within the top 500, then the exempt player could choose whoever he wants as long as they are a professional from the same country. World qualifiers were held in September. Nine countries earned their spot in the World Cup, three each from the European, Asian, and South American qualifiers. The host country, China, rounded out the field.

The event was a 72-hole stroke play team event with each team consisting of two players. The first and third days were fourball play and the second and final days were foursomes play.

Teams

Source

Final leaderboard

Source

References

External links
Official site
Coverage on the PGA Tour's official site

World Cup (men's golf)
Golf tournaments in China
Sport in Shenzhen
World Cup (men's)
World Cup golf
World Cup golf
Sports competitions in Guangdong